Anand Singh may refer to:

Anand Singh (Fijian politician) (1948–2020), Fijian lawyer and former politician of Indian descent
Anand Singh (cricketer) (born 1986), Indian cricketer
Anand Singh (Karnataka politician), Indian politician from the state of Karnataka
Anand Singh (Uttar Pradesh politician) (born 1936)
Anand Mohan Singh, convicted criminal and was the founder of the Bihar People's Party